Diego Araújo Hoffmann (born 4 February 1993) is a Brazilian former footballer who played as a defender. He spent the majority of his career in Brazil, having a brief loan spell with Lechia Gdańsk in Poland. Hoffmann made 2 appearances in Brazil's Série A, spending the later years of his playing career in the lower divisions of Brazilian football.

References

External links
 

Living people
1993 births
Brazilian footballers
Association football defenders
Sociedade Esportiva e Recreativa Caxias do Sul players
Criciúma Esporte Clube players
Lechia Gdańsk players
Esporte Clube Juventude players
Brazilian expatriate footballers
Brazilian expatriate sportspeople in Poland
Expatriate footballers in Poland
Campeonato Brasileiro Série A players
Sportspeople from Paraná (state)